Sutton-in-Craven is a village, electoral ward and (as just Sutton) a civil parish in the Craven district of North Yorkshire, England that is situated in the Aire Valley between Skipton and Keighley. Historically part of the West Riding of Yorkshire, in 2001 the population was 3,480, increasing to 3,714 at the Census 2011.
The village is adjacent to Glusburn and Cross Hills, but although these three effectively form a small town, Sutton village maintains its distinct identity.

History
The village existed before 1086 as "Sutun": listed in the Domesday Book. The landowner then was Ravenkeld who was taxed on 240 acres (100 hectares) of ploughland. But lands were then given by the Norman crown to its compatriots: Robert de Romille followed by Edmund de Boyvill and then Adam de Copley.

In the 14th century, the village was known as Sutton-in-Ayrdale but became Sutton-in-Craven in 1620.

In the late 17th century Sutton-in-Craven became part of the ancient parish of Kildwick so all Sutton residents were baptised, married and buried at Kildwick Parish Church. But in 1869 Sutton was constituted as a separate ecclesiastical district. Building a church for the new parish started in 1868 and its consecration day was the feast of St. Thomas, 21 December 1869.

Sutton-in-Craven Church of England Primary School opened in 1858.

Industry
The main industry was farming of livestock until the Industrial Revolution when that was largely replaced by the textile industry. One of the oldest mills, Greenroyd Mill at Sutton Clough, was in 1815 Peter Hartley's cotton mill but only the remains of its two dams are still visible. The 1831 Census lists numerous cotton weavers. The Bairstow family were woollen manufacturers from 1838 until 1970 but a nursing home and houses now stand on the site of their mill. Only one of the original mill buildings remains today.

Transport
In 1773 the first Bingley to Skipton section of the Leeds and Liverpool Canal passed  to the north of Sutton. By 1781 the canal joined Leeds to Gargrave, and in 1816 completed the link to Liverpool.

In 1786 the Keighley and Kendal Turnpike road opened, followed in 1823 by the Blackburn to Addingham road, resulting in six stagecoaches a day passing through the area.

In 1847 the Leeds and Bradford Extension Railway opened its Shipley to Skipton section that passes  to the north of Sutton at the Kildwick and Crosshills railway station.

Landmarks
A park is opposite the Baptist Church behind the County Primary School. Sutton Clough, formerly part of the Sutton Hall Estate, is at the south of the village, and Lund's Tower and Wainman's Pinnacle are on a hill to the south-west. Craven House, the oldest village building, faces High Street and dates from the late 16th to early 17th centuries.

People 

The artist and scientific illustrator Brian Hargreaves (1935-2011) was born in Sutton.

Gallery

References

External links

Sutton-in-Craven Parish Council
Sutton-in-Craven Village Website
SUTTONsource Community Pages
Google Maps Sutton-in-Craven
Facebook on Sutton-in-Craven

Villages in North Yorkshire
Civil parishes in North Yorkshire
Craven District